L’Uzine ("the factory") is an art and culture space in the industrial zone of Aïn Sebaâ in Casablanca, Morocco. The Touria and Abdelaziz Tazi Foundation founded L'Uzine in 2014. Activities hosted at L'Uzine have included concerts, art exhibitions, film screenings, workshops, seminars and debates, and dance and theatrical performances.

Activities
Chbe3 Fen f’ Ramdan is an annual art and culture program that takes place during Ramadan.

Cypher is a breakdancing competition organized by Yoriyas.

References

Year of establishment missing
Art museums and galleries in Morocco
Theatres in Morocco
Buildings and structures in Casablanca
Organizations based in Casablanca